"Burn Out" is a song recorded by American country music band Midland. It is the third single from their 2017 debut album On the Rocks. The band's three members, Mark Wystrach, Cameron Duddy, and Jess Carson, co-wrote the song with Shane McAnally and Josh Osborne, the latter two of whom co-produced it with Dann Huff.

Content
The song is about a male narrator watching a relationship "burn out", comparing it to a cigarette burning itself out. Lead singer Mark Wystrach told the blog Taste of Country that he sees the song as a prequel to their 2017 debut single "Drinkin' Problem", saying that "Burn Out" is "very much in the same landscape. It could tell the story of how the character in 'Drinkin' Problem' could get to that place, as usually is the case through heartache". He also feels that the song draws inspiration from Dean Dillon and Gary Stewart, while also noting the group's prominent vocal harmonies.

Music video
Directed by TK McKamy, the video was filmed in one single take at the nightclub Billy Bob's Texas in Fort Worth, Texas. Wystrach said that the video, which features him rescuing a female bar patron from a rude customer, takes inspiration from the 1980 movie Urban Cowboy, which itself was filmed partially at Billy Bob's. Live version was directed by Roger Pistole and premiered on CMT, GAC & Vevo in 2018.

Personnel
From On the Rocks liner notes.

Musicians
 Jess Carson – acoustic guitar, background vocals
 Cameron Duddy – bass guitar, background vocals
 Paul Franklin – steel guitar
 Dann Huff – acoustic guitar, electric guitar
 Charlie Judge – keyboards
 Greg Morrow – drums
 Derek Wells – electric guitar
 Mark Wystrach – lead vocals

Technical
 Dann Huff – producer
 David Huff – digital editing
 Steve Marcantonio – recording
 Shane McAnally – producer
 Andrew Mendelson – mastering
 Justin Niebank – mixing
 Josh Osborne – producer
 Chris Small – digital editing

Charts

Weekly charts

Year-end charts

Certifications

References

2017 songs
2018 singles
Midland (band) songs
Songs written by Jess Carson
Songs written by Cameron Duddy
Songs written by Shane McAnally
Songs written by Josh Osborne
Songs written by Mark Wystrach
Song recordings produced by Shane McAnally
Song recordings produced by Dann Huff
Big Machine Records singles
Music videos directed by TK McKamy